Radek Havel may refer to:

 Radek Havel (ice hockey) (born 1994), Czech ice hockey player
 Radek Havel (swimmer) (born 1961), Czech swimmer